Aion (2003) is an album by the Finnish rock group CMX. The word Aion (or Aeon) is Ancient Greek for "age, life-force" and also a Finnish verb form meaning "I intend (to do something)".

The album is regarded as something of a concept album by the band and listeners alike; a common theme throughout the songs is the concept of the devil and how this concept manifests itself in the mortal world.

The album was placed at #50 in Finnish rock magazine Soundi's list of "50 most remarkable Finnish rock albums of all time".

Track listing
All songs written by CMX with lyrics by A. W. Yrjänä.

 "Pirunnyrkki" – 3:19  ("Devil's Fist") 
 "Sielunvihollinen" – 4:00  ("Satan", lit. "Enemy of the Soul") 
 "Melankolia" – 4:12  ("Melancholy") 
 "Fysiikka ei kestä" – 4:53  ("Physics Will Not Last") 
 "Palvelemaan konetta" – 3:52  ("To Serve a Machine") 
 "Kuoleman risteyksestä kolme virstaa pohjoiseen" – 5:42  ("Three Versts North from the Crossing of Death") 
 "Kyyn pimeä puoli" – 3:17  ("Dark Side of the Viper") 
 "Sivu paholaisen päiväkirjasta" – 4:12  ("Page from the Devil's Diary") 
 "Nahkasiipi" – 4:20  ("Leather Wing") 
 "Ensimmäinen saattaja" – 5:42  ("First Escort") 
 "Hautalinnut" – 6:12  ("Grave Birds")

Personnel
 A. W. Yrjänä – vocals, bass guitar, acoustic guitar, producer
 Janne Halmkrona – guitar, bass guitar, trumpet, Rhodes piano, glockenspiel, backing vocals, producer
 Timo Rasio – guitars, bass guitar, backing vocals
 Tuomas Peippo – drums, percussion
 Rake – producer, engineer, mixing, programming, keyboards
 Anna-Leena Haikola, Janne Ahvenainen, Kati Kiraly, Marja-Sisko Lahti, Riikka Lampinen, Maija Juuti, Lotta Poijärvi, Siiri Rasta – strings
 Pauli Saastamoinen – mastering
 Ari Talusén – photography
 Olga Poppius – photography
 Sami Fiander – sleeve design
 Gabi Hakanen – executive producer

References 

CMX (band) albums
2003 albums